UTFO is the debut studio album by American hip hop group UTFO, released in 1985 by Select Records. The most notable track on the album is "Roxanne, Roxanne"—the track that ignited the Roxanne Wars. The tracks "The Real Roxanne" and "Calling Her a Crab (Roxanne Part 2)" are answer songs.

Track listing

References

External links 

1985 debut albums
UTFO albums
Select Records albums
Albums produced by Full Force